The Porter from Maxim's (French: Le chasseur de chez Maxim's) may refer to:

 The Porter from Maxim's (play), a 1923 play by the French writers Yves Mirande and Gustave Quinson 
 The Porter from Maxim's (1927 film), a French silent film directed by Roger Lion
 The Porter from Maxim's (1933 film), a French film directed by Karl Anton
 The Porter from Maxim's (1939 film), a French film directed by Maurice Cammage 
 The Porter from Maxim's (1953 film), a French film directed by Henri Diamant-Berger 
 The Porter from Maxim's (1976 film), a French film directed by Claude Vital